Daniel Schell (born 20 January 1980) is an Australian rules footballer. He played for both the Fremantle and the Adelaide Football Clubs.  He was drafted from Central District in the SANFL as the 18th selection in the 1998 AFL Draft and played mainly as a full forward.

Schell struggled to be a successful forward at AFL level, kicking less than a goal per game over his 4 season career, but has proved to be much more successful at SANFL and WAFL level, being the leading goal scoring in the SANFL twice, for Central District three times and for South Fremantle twice.

References

External links

1980 births
Fremantle Football Club players
South Fremantle Football Club players
Central District Football Club players
Adelaide Football Club players
Living people
Australian rules footballers from South Australia